Shaul Shats (born 1944) (variant names Shaul Shatz, Saul Shatz) is an Israeli painter, printmaker and illustrator, born in 1944 in Kibbutz Sarid, Israel. He studied at the Bezalel Academy of Art and Design, Jerusalem (1965–66), the Rietveld Academy, Amsterdam (1967), and the Freie Akademie, The Hague (1967). Shats taught at the Bezalel Academy from 1978–82. He won the Israel Museum Prize for Illustration (1990), the Jerusalem Prize (1992), the Ben Yitzhak Prize for Illustration of Israeli Children's Books (1992), and the Ish-Shalom Prize.

Shats continues to live and work in Jerusalem.

Selected exhibitions
 2007: Ella Gallery, Jerusalem
 2005: Jerusalem Artists’ House, Jerusalem
 2004: Our Landscape: Notes on Landscape Painting in Israel, University of Haifa Art Gallery, Haifa (online catalogue)
 2003: Bineth Gallery, Tel-Aviv
 1984: Cardo Gallery, Jerusalem
 1971: Little Gallery, Jerusalem
 1969: Engel Gallery, Jerusalem

Selected collections
 Israel Museum, Jerusalem
 Tel Aviv Museum of Art
 Stedelijk Museum, Amsterdam

References
 Ayal, Avishay, and Yoram Bar-Gal. Our Landscape: Notes on Landscape Painting in Israel [exhibition catalogue]. Haifa: University of Haifa Art Gallery, 2004.
 Shaul Shats: Paintings [exhibition catalogue]. Jerusalem: Cardo Gallery, 1984.

External links
 Israeli Art Centre (Israel Museum, Jerusalem - Shaul Shats)

Living people
1944 births
Bezalel Academy of Arts and Design alumni
Israeli painters